Sergio Bustos (born December 20, 1972) is a retired Argentine football player.

References

External links
 Argentine Primera statistics  

1972 births
Living people
Footballers from Buenos Aires
Argentine footballers
Racing Club de Avellaneda footballers
1. FC Nürnberg players
Chacarita Juniors footballers
Club Atlético Platense footballers
Argentinos Juniors footballers
Dresdner SC players
Chemnitzer FC players
Defensa y Justicia footballers
Talleres de Córdoba footballers
Bundesliga players
2. Bundesliga players
Expatriate footballers in Germany
Expatriate footballers in Ecuador
Argentine expatriate sportspeople in Ecuador
Association football midfielders
Argentine expatriate sportspeople in Germany